Newspaper Mama is the fifth studio album by Australian children's musician Peter Combe. It was released in 1988 and was certified gold in Australia in June 1989.

At the ARIA Music Awards of 1989, the album won the ARIA Award for Best Children's Album, Combe's second consecutive win.

Track listing
 Side A
 "Newspaper Mama"	
 "Six Juicy Apples"	
 "Blow Out the Candles"	
 "Happy As Larry"	
 "Edward J Fox"	
 "Syntax Error"	
 "All Good Things"	
 "The Front of Me"
 "Hammer in the Nails"	
 "Australia Hooray"	

Side B
 "Yellow Banana"	
 "Chish and Fips"	
 "Walking Encyclopaedia"	
 "Spangle Road"
 "Tell Me the Ti-i-ime Please"	
 "First Reader"
 "Chops and Sausages"
 "Snow White and Prince"	
 "Robin Hood's Dream"

All songs composed, arranged and produced by Peter Combe.

Certifications

Release history

References

1988 albums
Peter Combe albums
ARIA Award-winning albums